Panam City (romanised: Panam shohor/panam nogor) was an ancient city, the archaeological ruins of which is situated at Sonargaon, Narayanganj in Bangladesh. It is one of the earliest cities in Bangladesh that is still standing. 

Among the three cities of the time period: Boro nagar (Big City), Khas Nagar and Panam Nagar; Panam Nagar was the most attractive one. Reportedly, this is one of the most visited tourist spots in Bangladesh.

As the capital of the fifteenth-century Bengal ruler Isa Khan, the city was once an important trading and political center. Although the buildings are now mostly in ruins, the historical city boasts architectural examples from the Sultanate, Mughal, and British Colonial periods. 

The historic city, located near the present-day capital of Dhaka, includes several Mughal monuments—among them the Sonakanda River Fort, the Panch Pir Mazar Shrine, and Ibrahim's and Abdul Hamid's Mosque. British colonial architecture preserved in Sonargaon includes the Ananda Mohan Piddar House, and other street-front houses. For travelers making their way along the  Grand Trunk Road from Peshawar in the Hindu Kush, Sonargaon marked the end of the line. 

Threats to the site include flooding, vandalism, unauthorized occupation, illegal development etc. The historical buildings are becoming increasingly dilapidated with age and there are no signs of any significant restoration attempts in order to preserve the site.

Gallery

See also
 List of archaeological sites in Bangladesh

References
http://en.banglapedia.org/index.php/Sonargaon

Cities in Bangladesh
Ancient cities
Populated places in Bangladesh